Juan Bartolome de Bohórquez e Hinojosa, OP (24 August 1542 – September, 1633) was a Roman Catholic prelate who served as Bishop of Antequera (1617–1633) and Bishop of Coro (1611–1617).

Biography
Juan Bartolome de Bohórquez e Hinojosa was born in México on 24 August 1542 and ordained a priest in the Order of Preachers. On 17 July 1611, he was appointed during the papacy of Pope Paul V as Bishop of Coro. On 13 November 1617, he was appointed during the papacy of Pope Paul V as Bishop of Antequera. He served as Bishop of Antequera until his death in September 1633.

While bishop, he was the principal consecrator of Francisco de la Cámara y Raya, Bishop of Panamá (1614); Gonzalo de Angulo, Bishop of Coro (1618); and Bernardino de Salazar y Frías, Bishop of Chiapas (1623).

References

External links and additional sources
 (for Chronology of Bishops) 
 (for Chronology of Bishops) 
 (for Chronology of Bishops) 
 (for Chronology of Bishops) 

17th-century Roman Catholic bishops in Venezuela
Bishops appointed by Pope Paul V
1542 births
1633 deaths
Dominican bishops
17th-century Roman Catholic bishops in Mexico
Roman Catholic bishops of Coro